Michael John Grice (3 November 1931 – August 2002) was an English footballer who played as a winger.

Career
Born in Woking, Surrey, Grice began his career at Lowestoft Town before signing for Colchester United in 1952. He was selected to play for the Third Division South representative side in 1954–55.

He joined West Ham United for £10,000 in 1955 and was a part of West Ham's promotion winning side of 1957–58.

Grice joined Coventry City for the 1961–62 season. He made 38 Third Division appearances, scoring six goals, before moving back to Colchester the following year. He later returned to Lowestoft Town of the Eastern Counties League alongside former Hammer Albert Foan.

Honours

Club
West Ham United
 Football League Second Division Winner (1): 1957–58

References

External links
 

1931 births
2002 deaths
Sportspeople from Woking
English footballers
Association football wingers
Colchester United F.C. players
West Ham United F.C. players
Coventry City F.C. players
English Football League players
Lowestoft Town F.C. players